The Faint Object Camera (FOC) was a camera installed on the Hubble Space Telescope from launch in 1990 until 2002. It was replaced by the Advanced Camera for Surveys. In December 1993, Hubble's vision was corrected on STS-61 by installing COSTARS, which corrected the problem with Hubble's mirror before it reached an instrument like FOC. Later instruments had this correction built in, which is why it was possible to later remove COSTARS itself and replace it with a new science instrument.

The camera was built by Dornier GmbH and was funded by the European Space Agency.  The unit actually consists of two complete and independent camera systems designed to provide extremely high resolution, exceeding 0.05 arcseconds.  It is designed to view very faint UV and optical light from 115 to 650 nanometers in wavelength. FOC has been compared to a "telephoto" lens, providing a high resolution in a small field of view. FOC could distinguish between two points 0.05 arc-seconds apart.

Rather than CCDs the FOC used photon-counting digicons as its detector.

The camera was designed to operate at low, medium, or high resolution.  The angular resolution and field of view at each resolution were as follows:

Imaging examples

Space work

References

External links

 First FOC image
 Images of Nova Cygni 1992 With Hubble's Old and New Optics 
 Pluto by FOC

Hubble Space Telescope instruments
Space imagers
Space hardware returned to Earth intact
European Space Agency